Rodney Mott is a referee in the National Basketball Association, where he has worked since 1998.

Career 
On January 12, 2007, Mott was suspended for three games after making obscene gestures and using obscenities toward fans during a game.

Mott officiated the 2013 NBA All-Star Game.

References

National Basketball Association referees
Living people
African-American sports officials
1957 births
People from New Albany, Indiana
San Diego State University alumni
Continental Basketball Association referees
21st-century African-American people
20th-century African-American sportspeople